Mark Kirchner (born 4 April 1970) is a German former biathlete.

Life and career
Kirchner won gold in the 10 km sprint at the Albertville Olympics in 1992 and followed that up by taking silver in the 20 km individual and gold in the relay. An out-of-the-blue win by Eugeni Redkine of the Unified Team in the 20 km individual prevented him taking honours as the absolute champion of these Games.

In 1994 in Lillehammer, he was his country's flag bearer and was part of the gold-medal winning relay team. He was the youngest ever triple Olympic Champion in biathlon, at the age of just 23 years and 10 month.

Kirchner came second in the overall World Cup standings twice, behind Sergei Tchepikov of the USSR in the 1990–91 season and behind Mikael Löfgren of Sweden in 1992–93.

In addition Kirchner became World Champion multiple times.

He retired relatively early, at the age of 28, in 1998.

Subsequently, Kirchner was employed as an assistant to Frank Ullrich, the German biathlon male team head coach, with responsibilities including youth development. In April 2014, he was appointed as men's coach for the national team.

Biathlon results
All results are sourced from the International Biathlon Union.

Olympic Games
4 medals (3 gold, 1 silver)

World Championships
10 medals (7 gold, 1 silver, 2 bronze)

*During Olympic seasons competitions are only held for those events not included in the Olympic program.
**Pursuit was added as an event in 1997.

Individual victories
11 victories (6 In, 5 Sp)

*Results are from UIPMB and IBU races which include the Biathlon World Cup, Biathlon World Championships and the Winter Olympic Games.

References

External links

 

1970 births
Living people
People from Neuhaus am Rennweg
Sportspeople from Thuringia
German male biathletes
Biathletes at the 1992 Winter Olympics
Biathletes at the 1994 Winter Olympics
Olympic biathletes of Germany
Medalists at the 1992 Winter Olympics
Medalists at the 1994 Winter Olympics
Olympic medalists in biathlon
Olympic silver medalists for Germany
Olympic gold medalists for Germany
Biathlon World Championships medalists
Holmenkollen Ski Festival winners
German cross-country skiing coaches
20th-century German people